"I Should Be Proud" is a 1970 protest song written by Henry Cosby, Pam Sawyer and Joe Hinton and recorded by Motown girl group Martha and the Vandellas (credited as Martha Reeves & the Vandellas).

Background
The song was noted for being the first released Motown protest song (released in February of the year), just months before the releases of Edwin Starr's "War" and The Temptations' "Ball of Confusion". 

The song had the narrator talk of how she was devastated on hearing the news that her loved one, who had been fighting in the Vietnam War, had been shot and killed in action. Instead of being proud that her loved one had "fought for her", as people around her were claiming, all she wanted was him and not his honors for fighting the war, exclaiming that the man, disguised as "Private Johnny C. Miller", had been "fightin' for the evils of society". On the MSNBC program, Headliners And Legends: Martha & The Vandellas, Reeves commented that this song was pulled off many radio stations' playlists due to its controversial "anti-war" message during the height of the Vietnam War.  Lead singer Martha Reeves took the song personally, recounting that one of her brothers had died in a Vietnam War-related incident. It was the first release off the Vandellas' Natural Resources Motown LP.

Personnel
 Lead vocals by Martha Reeves
 Background vocals by Sandra Tilley, Lois Reeves, and The Andantes: Marlene Barrow, Jackie Hicks and Louvain Demps
 Instrumentation by The Funk Brothers

Chart performance
Though not a big hit (peaking at #80 pop and #45 R&B),, the song broke ground for protest songs, released on the Motown labels.

See also
List of anti-war songs

References

1970 singles
Protest songs
Anti-war songs
Songs of the Vietnam War
Martha and the Vandellas songs
Songs written by Pam Sawyer
Songs written by Henry Cosby
Motown singles
Gordy Records singles